This is the filmography of Jean Arthur (October 17, 1900 – June 19, 1991), including her television work.

References

 Oller, John. Jean Arthur: The Actress Nobody Knew. New York: Limelight Editions, 1997. .
 
 
 
 Turner Classic Movies "Star of the Month" Profile

Arthur, Jean
Arthur, Jean